Prior to effective engine control unit computers, engine vacuum was used for many functions in an automobile.  Vacuum switches were employed to regulate this flow. For instance a dual port vacuum switch located in a port on the intake manifold monitored the coolant temperature in the coolant crossover. It received vacuum (port E on the switch) from the carburetor. The vacuum flowed through the switch to a vacuum solenoid (such as a heat riser, used to restrict exhaust allowing the engine to heat up faster).  When the coolant heated to operating temperature the vacuum switch closed off the port (port S on the vacuum switch) turning off the vacuum to the heat riser.  The result is to clear the exhaust restriction.  The switch monitored the temperature and when conditions were right it performed its designed function.

See also
Manifold vacuum
Automobile accessory power

Switches